The Kingdom of Thessalonica was a short-lived Crusader State founded after the Fourth Crusade over conquered Byzantine lands in Macedonia and Thessaly.

History

Background 

After the fall of Constantinople to the crusaders in 1204, Boniface of Montferrat, the leader of the crusade, was expected by both the Crusaders and the defeated Byzantines to become the new emperor. However, the Venetians felt that Boniface was too closely tied to the Byzantine Empire, as his brother Conrad had married into the Byzantine imperial family. The Venetians wanted an emperor whom they could control more easily, and with their influence, Baldwin of Flanders was elected as emperor of the new Latin Empire.

Establishment 

Boniface reluctantly accepted this, and set out to conquer Thessalonica, the second-largest Byzantine city after Constantinople. At first he had to compete with Emperor Baldwin, who also wanted the city. He then went on to capture the city later in 1204 and set up a kingdom there, subordinate to Baldwin, although the title of "king" was never officially used. Late 13th and 14th century sources suggest that Boniface based his claim to Thessalonica on the statement that his younger brother Renier had been granted Thessalonica on his marriage to Maria Komnene in 1180.

In 1204–05, Boniface was able to extend his rule south into Greece, advancing through Thessaly, Boeotia, Euboea, and Attica. The boundaries of the actual Kingdom of Thessalonica seem to have extended only up to Domokos, Pharsalus, and Velestino: southern Thessaly, with the towns of Zetounion and Ravennika, was under governors appointed by the Latin Emperor, and the principalities of southern Greece were only Boniface's feudal vassals. Emperor Henry of Flanders' expedition against the rebellious Lombard barons of Thessalonica in 1208–09, however, ended the feudal dependency of the southern principalities—the Duchy of Athens, the Marquisate of Bodonitsa, the Lordship of Salona, and the Triarchy of Negroponte—on Thessalonica, replacing it with direct imperial suzerainty.

The Lombard Rebellion 

Boniface's rule lasted less than two years before he was ambushed by Tsar Kaloyan of Bulgaria and killed on September 4, 1207. The kingdom passed to Boniface's son Demetrius, who was still a baby, so actual power was held by various minor nobles of Lombard origin. These nobles, under the regent Oberto, began plotting to place William VI of Montferrat, Boniface's elder son, on the throne, and openly defied the Latin Emperor Henry of Flanders. Henry marched against them in 1209 and forced their submission. As a result, Henry's brother Eustace then became regent for Demetrius.

War with Epirus and fall 

Taking advantage of this situation, Michael I of Epirus, a former ally of Boniface, attacked the kingdom in 1210, as did the Bulgarians. Henry of Flanders eventually defeated both, but after Michael's death in 1214, his brother and successor Theodore began anew the assault on the kingdom. Over the next nine years Theodore gradually conquered all of Thessalonica except the city itself, as the Latin Empire could spare no army to defend it while they were busy fighting the Byzantine Empire of Nicaea in Asia. In 1224, just as Demetrius had become old enough to take power for himself, Theodore finally captured Thessalonica and the kingdom became part of the Despotate of Epirus.

Titular claimants 

The kingdom was claimed by titular kings of the house of Montferrat until 1284 and also by the dukes of Burgundy; Baldwin II of Constantinople had promised the title to Hugh IV should he regain the Latin Empire.

References

Bibliography
 
 
 
 

 
States and territories established in 1204
1224 disestablishments
Former countries in the Balkans
Former vassal states
States of Frankish and Latin Greece
13th century in Greece
Lists of nobility of the Crusader states
Former kingdoms